RIK 1 (Greek: ΡΙΚ 1) is a Cypriot television channel owned and operated by Cyprus Broadcasting Corporation. It was launched in 1957.

External links

Television channels in Cyprus
Television channels and stations established in 1957
Greek-language television stations